Sal is a 2011 biographical film depicting the last few hours of the life of Sal Mineo, one of the first major film actors in Hollywood to publicly acknowledge their own bisexuality or homosexuality. Mineo was murdered on February 12, 1976. The film, directed by James Franco, stars Val Lauren in the title role, and is based in part on Michael Gregg Michaud's book Sal Mineo: A Biography. The film also stars Jim Parrack, James Franco and Vince Jolivette in supporting roles.

Franco optioned the film in 2010, and shooting began during the summer of 2011. The film premiered at the 2011 Venice Film Festival and was set for theatrical release in November 2013.

Cast

References

External links
 

2011 films
American biographical films
Films directed by James Franco
Films set in 1976
2011 LGBT-related films
2010s English-language films
2010s American films